Mohsen Karami (born 11 August  1995) is an Iranian football midfielder.

Club career

Saba Qom
Karami started his career with Saba Qom. In summer 2011 he was promoted to the first team and made his debut for Saba Qom against Saipa on April 11, 2015 as a substitute for Abolfazl Ebrahimi.

Club career statistics

References

External links
 Mohsen Karami at IranLeague.ir

1995 births
Living people
People from Qom
Iranian footballers
Saba players
Persian Gulf Pro League players
Azadegan League players
Association football midfielders